"Price of Fame" is a song by American recording artist Michael Jackson. It was originally planned to be the theme for a Pepsi commercial but was replaced by an edited version of "Bad".
It was released on the Bad 25 album. Later, the Pepsi version was released online on 2015.

Background and recording
"Price of Fame" was recorded for a Pepsi ad that was scrapped late in development but was put into the Bad 25 album. According to Matt Forger, the song was mixed by Bill Bottrell.

Critical reception
Joe Vogel, who has written two books about Jackson, described the opening as reminiscent of the Police song "Spirits in the Material World". He also compared the verses to "Billie Jean" and the chords to "Who Is It". He also praised the vocal performance as "powerful" and said "listen to the way he bits into the lyric: 'My father never lies!'", and contrasted the song to the "easy bliss" of "Free", the previous track.

See also
 List of unreleased Michael Jackson material
 Death of Michael Jackson
 List of music released posthumously

References

1986 songs
Michael Jackson songs
Songs written by Michael Jackson
Song recordings produced by Michael Jackson
Songs released posthumously